

Notable people associated with Haringey
Adele, singer
David Lammy,  MP for Tottenham 
Emer Kenny, actress
Keith Blakelock, policeman
Emily Bowes Gosse, artist
Harry Champion, music hall composer and performer
Teriy Keys, music executive, entrepreneur founder and co-chief executive officer of R.O.A.D. Group
Rebel MC, aka Congo Natty, rapper, DJ and record producer
Urban Species, band
Dave Clark and the Dave Clark Five, 1960s pop group
Charles Conder, painter
Errol Dunkley, reggae musician
William Edward Forster, industrialist and politician
Edmund Gosse, poet, author, and critic
Philip Gosse, naturalist, marine biologist
Bernie Grant, politician
Clare Grogan, singer, actress
Maria Hack, educational writer and Quaker controversialist
Steriker Hare, cricketer
Jack Hawkins, actor
Sir Rowland Hill, teacher, inventor, postal reformer
Mark Hollis, composer, musician, singer-songwriter
Len Hughes, footballer
JME, rapper, co-owner of Boy Better Know and record producer
Wretch 32, rapper
John Eliot Howard, chemist
Joseph Howard, MP, first MP for Tottenham
Luke Howard, chemist, father of meteorology
Leee John and Imagination, 1980s soul group
Lemar, soul and R&B singer songwriter
David Lyndon, Architect
Harrison Marks, glamour photographer
Pops Mensah-Bonsu, basketball player
Trevor Peacock, actor
Leslie Phillips, actor
Ian Rankin, author
Simon Raymonde, musician and record producer
Mike Reid, comedian
Charlie Rowe, actor
George Sewell, actor
Skepta, rapper, co-owner of Boy Better Know and record producer
Regina Spektor, Russian-American singer-songwriter
Dennis Spooner, screenwriter and editor
Jessie Wallace, actress
Shani Wallis, actress and singer 
Mark Watson, comedian
Keisha White, R&B singer
Mike and Bernie Winters, comedians
Chip, rapper and songwriter

Haringey